Empires is the third studio album by the alternative electronic band VNV Nation. It was released in 1999 in the EU and 2000 in the United States jointly under the Metropolis and Dependent labels. The album combines trance, synthpop, and electronic body music (EBM).

"Darkangel" was released as a single on 28 June prior to the album, and "Standing" became a single, and was also released as part of the Burning Empires EP in 2000.

The album was ranked #1 on the German Alternative Charts (DAC) 1999 albums chart, while "Darkangel" ranked #15 on the DAC Singles chart that same year. The U.S. release of Empires peaked at #6 on the CMJ RPM Charts.

Track listing

References

External links
 Official VNV Nation website
 [ AMG Review]

VNV Nation albums
1999 albums
2000 albums